Aksentyevo is the name of several rural localities in Russia.

Modern localities
Aksentyevo, Kostroma Oblast, a village in Ust-Neyskoye Settlement of Makaryevsky District in Kostroma Oblast; 
Aksentyevo, Moscow Oblast, a village in Borisovskoye Rural Settlement of Mozhaysky District in Moscow Oblast; 
Aksentyevo, Nizhny Novgorod Oblast, a village in Varezhsky Selsoviet of Pavlovsky District in Nizhny Novgorod Oblast
Aksentyevo, Novgorod Oblast, a village in Yazhelbitskoye Settlement of Valdaysky District in Novgorod Oblast
Aksentyevo, Pskov Oblast, a village in Pskovsky District of Pskov Oblast
Aksentyevo, Kuvshinovsky District, Tver Oblast, a village in Tysyatskoye Rural Settlement of Kuvshinovsky District in Tver Oblast
Aksentyevo, Zapadnodvinsky District, Tver Oblast, a village in Ilyinskoye Rural Settlement of Zapadnodvinsky District in Tver Oblast
Aksentyevo, Nikolsky District, Vologda Oblast, a village in Krasnopolyansky Selsoviet of Nikolsky District in Vologda Oblast
Aksentyevo, Nyuksensky District, Vologda Oblast, a village in Bobrovsky Selsoviet of Nyuksensky District in Vologda Oblast
Aksentyevo, Vashkinsky District, Vologda Oblast, a village in Kisnemsky Selsoviet of Vashkinsky District in Vologda Oblast
Aksentyevo, Yaroslavl Oblast, a village in Fominsky Rural Okrug of Tutayevsky District in Yaroslavl Oblast

Alternative names
Aksentyevo, alternative name of Avksentyevo, a village in Soltanovskoye Settlement of Neysky District in Kostroma Oblast;

See also
Aksentyev, a Russian last name
Avksentyevo, several rural localities in Kostroma Oblast, Russia